Henry Jerome Augustine Fane de Salis, (born Pisa 16 January 1828, died Virginia Water 18 February 1915) was an English cleric and JP (Surrey), of Portnall Park, Virginia Water.

Life
The seventh son of the 4th Count de Salis, he was educated at Eton College, and then Exeter College, Oxford, where he matriculated in 1847 and graduated B.A. in 1850.

De Salis was Rector of Fringford from 1852 until 1872. He then inherited Portnall Park, Virginia Water, Staines, Surrey from his brother-in-law, Thomas-Chaloner Bisse-Challoner (1788-1872)
Later he was chairman of Egham's Holloway Sanatorium, and of the Old Windsor Board of Guardians.

Marriage
He married, on 29 March 1853, (Minnie) Grace Elizabeth Henley, (8 July 1823 - Virginia Water 28 August 1898), daughter of J. W. Henley, MP, and Georgina Fane.
They had four sons- Rodolph, Cecil, William, and Charles Fane de Salis- and a daughter, Georgiana (1861-1910)

References

1828 births
1915 deaths
English people of Swiss descent
Henry Jerome Augustine
Counts de Salis-Soglio and Comtes de Salis-Seewis
People educated at Eton College
Alumni of Exeter College, Oxford
Burials in Surrey
People from Virginia Water
Henry Jerome Augustine